New Bradwell St Peter Football Club is a football club based in New Bradwell in Milton Keynes, England.

History
The club was established in 1902 by members of the St James Church on Newport Road under the name Stantonbury St James, although they were soon renamed Stantonbury St Peter. They won the North Bucks & District League in 1912–13 and retained the title the following season. The club won the league again in 1938–39. In 1946 they adopted their current name after merging with New Bradwell Corinthians. The club went on to win the Leighton & District Challenge Cup in the 1949–50 season.

In 1970 New Bradwell St Peter moved up to Division One of the South Midlands League. Under the guidance of manager Brian Gibbs the club were Division One champions in the 1976–77 season, earning promotion to the Premier Division where they spent four seasons before finishing bottom of the division in 1980–81, resulting in relegation back to Division One. The club were Division One champions again in 1983–84, this time under the management of Malc Burridge, and were promoted to the Premier Division. They finished bottom of the Premier Division in 1992–93 and were relegated to the Senior Division. In 1997 the league merged with the Spartan League to form the Spartan South Midlands League, with the club placed in the Senior Division.

Under player/manager Simon Spooner New Bradwell St Peter were Senior Division champions in the league's inaugural season, earning promotion to the Premier Division. In 1999–2000 they won the Berks and Bucks Senior Trophy under the management of Andy Milne and Paul Bevis, beating Milton Keynes City 3–1 on penalties after a 1–1 draw. However, the club finished bottom of the Premier Division in 2001–02 and were relegated to Division One. In 2012–13 they finished bottom of Division One and were relegated to Division Two.

A third-place finish in Division Two in 2014–15 saw New Bradwell St Peter promoted back to Division One. However, despite finishing ninth in Division One the following season, the club were demoted back to Division Two due to their ground failing to meet the required grading. They resigned from the league at the end of the 2016–17 season after most of the committee resigned. In 2018 the name New Bradwell St Peter was resurrected when Spartan South Midlands League Division Two club Loughton Manor adopted the name and moved to the Recreation Ground.

Ground
The club played at the Red Bridge field until World War II, after which they moved to the Mutual Meadow on Newport Road. They also relocated their headquarters from the Forresters Arms to the Railway Tavern. The club later relocated to the Recreation Ground on Bradwell Road in the Bradville area of Milton Keynes. Floodlights were installed in 1998.

Honours
Spartan South Midlands League
Senior Division champions 1997–98
South Midlands League
Division One champions 1976–77, 1983–84
North Bucks & District League
Champions 1912–13, 1913–14, 1938–39
Berks & Bucks FA Senior Trophy
Winners 1999–2000
Leighton and District Challenge Cup
Winners 1949–50

Records
Best FA Vase performance: Second qualifying round, 2015–16

See also
New Bradwell St Peter F.C. players
New Bradwell St Peter F.C. managers

References

External links
Official website

 
Association football clubs established in 1902
1902 establishments in England
Sport in Milton Keynes
North Bucks & District Football League
South Midlands League
Spartan South Midlands Football League